Ariclenes Jorge Gabriel da Silva  or simply Ari (born April 18, 1986), is a Brazilian goalkeeper. He currently plays for Barras.

Contract
5 July 2006 to 31 December 2007

External links 

 zerozero.pt
 sambafoot
 Guardian Stats Centre
 figueirense.com

1986 births
Living people
Brazilian footballers
Londrina Esporte Clube players
Figueirense FC players
Salgueiro Atlético Clube players
Association football goalkeepers
Footballers from Curitiba